Gold King Creek Airport  is a public-use airport located at . It is 39 nautical miles (45 mi, 72 km) southeast of Fairbanks, Alaska, and is owned by the State of Alaska DOT&PF.

Facilities and aircraft 
Gold King Creek Airport covers an area of 30 acres (12 ha) at an elevation of 1,720 feet (524 m) above mean sea level. It has one runway designated 9/27 with a gravel and dirt surface measuring 2,558 by 17 feet (780 x 5 m). For the 12-month period ending December 31, 2005, the airport had 50 general aviation aircraft operations, an average of 4 per month.

References

External links 
 Topographic map from USGS The National Map

Airports in Denali Borough, Alaska